Marvin Krislov (born August 24, 1960) is the eighth and current president of Pace University in New York. Prior to President Krislov’s appointment at Pace, he served for 10 years as the president of Oberlin College and nine years as the vice president and general counsel of the University of Michigan.

Biography 
Krislov was born in Lexington, Kentucky to a Jewish family in 1960.  A 1982 Yale College graduate with a degree in political science and winner of the Alpheus Henry Snow Prize, Krislov attended Magdalen College, Oxford, as a Rhodes scholar. He then returned to New Haven to attend Yale Law School, where he was editor of the Yale Law Journal.

Krislov began his law career as a clerk for Judge Marilyn Hall Patel of the U.S. District Court for the Northern District of California in San Francisco. From 1989 to 1993 he served in an honors program at the U.S. Department of Justice, prosecuting cases involving police brutality and racial violence. He then spent three years at the White House Counsel's office before moving to the U.S. Department of Labor, where he served as Acting Solicitor of Labor until leaving the office to become vice president and general counsel at the University of Michigan.

In 1998, Krislov became the first person to serve as both vice president and general counsel at the University of Michigan. As general counsel to the University, he dispensed legal services on matters ranging from defending affirmative action to appealing penalties levied against the Michigan Wolverines basketball team by the National Collegiate Athletic Association. Krislov led the defense of University of Michigan in Gratz vs Bollinger where the US Supreme Court upheld appeals and lower court findings that the University's admissions practices based on race were unconstitutional although upholding the concepts of affirmative action in admissions. An offshoot of the case was that the plaintiff, Jennifer Gratz, was inspired to later found the Michigan Civil Rights Initiative that led in the passage of Michigan Constitutional Amendment that prohibited discrimination against, or grant preferential treatment to, any individual or group on the basis of race, sex, color, ethnicity, or national origin in the operation of public employment, public education, or public contracting.

In addition to managing University of Michigan legal affairs, Krislov served as co-chair of the President's Task Force on Ethics in Public Life, an initiative designed to consider establishing a center for research, teaching and learning that will integrate academic study with "real-world problems." He was also an adjunct professor at both the University of Michigan's Law School and its Political Science department, where he taught upper-level seminars on public policy and the law.

He is a member of a variety of academic service organizations, including the American Anthropological Association's Project Advisory Board on Race and Human Variation, the Michigan Rhodes Scholars Selection Committee, and the Executive Committee of the University of Michigan Institute for Labor and Industrial Relations. Krislov's community service activities include leadership positions in the Washtenaw County Jewish Foundation and the United Way of Washtenaw County, as well as membership on boards of arts organizations including the Mosaic Youth Theatre of Detroit and the University Musical Society. He also served as an alderman in New Haven shortly after graduating from Yale. He has three children: Zac, Jesse, and Evie Rose.

Notable publications
 The Next Twenty-five Years: Affirmative Action in Higher Education in the United States and South Africa David L. Featherman, Martin Hall, and Marvin Krislov, editors. Forewords by: Mary Sue Coleman, President of the University of Michigan and Njabulo Ndebele, Former Vice-Chancellor and Principal of the University of Cape Town. University of Michigan Press, Ann Arbor, 2009.

References

Living people
1960 births
20th-century American Jews
Presidents of Oberlin College
University of Michigan faculty
Yale College alumni
Alumni of Magdalen College, Oxford
American Rhodes Scholars
21st-century American Jews